The Nulhegan River is a  tributary of the Connecticut River in Essex County, Vermont.

Course 
The main stem of the river rises at the outlet of Nulhegan Pond in the eastern part of the town of Brighton, Vermont, and flows east into the town of Ferdinand. Near the eastern border of Ferdinand, the North Branch of the Nulhegan enters from the north. The main stem continues east into the northern corner of the town of Brunswick, then turns southeast upon entering the town of Bloomfield for its final descent to the Connecticut River at Bloomfield village, across from the village of North Stratford, New Hampshire.

Vermont Route 105 follows the Nulhegan River from source to mouth. The river is part of the Northern Forest Canoe Trail that extends from the Adirondack Mountains to Fort Kent, Maine.

The North Branch flows southeast through the west part of Lewis and the eastern corner of Brighton before entering the main Nulhegan River in the east part of the town of Ferdinand, just east of the location known as Wenlock.

The East Branch rises in the center of the town of Averill and flows briefly north and west before turning south and southeast for the majority of its course.

See also
List of rivers of Vermont

References 

Rivers of Vermont
Tributaries of the Connecticut River
Bodies of water of Essex County, Vermont
Bloomfield, Vermont
Brighton, Vermont
Brunswick, Vermont
Ferdinand, Vermont
Vermont placenames of Native American origin